The fourteenth and final season of  Degrassi, a Canadian serial teen drama television series, premiered on October 28, 2014. Although seven school years have passed in the story timeline since season six, season fourteen is set during the second term of the spring semester in the years it aired. Writers have been able to use a semi-floating timeline, so that the issues depicted are modern for their viewers. This season again depicts the lives of a group of high school freshmen, sophomores, seniors and Graduates as they deal with some of the challenges and issues that teenagers face such as teenage pregnancy, dysfunctional families, sexism, arson, sexting, sexual identity, miscarriages, anxiety disorders, drug use, child abuse, abstinence, and gang violence.

The fourteenth season was announced on November 13, 2013. Filming for the season commenced on April 11, 2014 at Epitome Studios in Toronto. Filming continued into August, with a break before filming the final four episodes of the season in order to give Epitome the opportunity to start filming episodes for the first season of their new series. Filming for this season completed on October 6, 2014. On June 4, 2015, it was announced that the season fourteen would be the last season of the series.

Cast 
The fourteenth season has twenty-five actors receiving star billing with twenty-two of them returning from the previous season. Returning cast members include: 

 Craig Arnold as Luke Baker (1 episode)
 Luke Bilyk as Drew Torres (20 episodes)
 Stefan Brogren as Archie "Snake" Simpson (7 episodes)
 Munro Chambers as Eli Goldsworthy (15 episodes)
 Sarah Fisher as Becky Baker (15 episodes)
 Ana Golja as Zoë Rivas (21 episodes)
 Nikki Gould as Grace Cardinal (21 episodes)
 Ricardo Hoyos as Zigmund "Zig" Novak (23 episodes)
 Demetrius Joyette as Mike "Dallas" Dallas (12 episodes)
 André Kim as Winston "Chewy" Chu (24 episodes)
 Lyle Lettau as Tristan Milligan (17 episodes)
 Spencer MacPherson as Hunter Hollingsworth (18 episodes)1
 Eric Osborne as Miles Hollingsworth III (20 episodes)
 Aislinn Paul as Clare Edwards (19 episodes)
 Cristine Prosperi as Imogen Moreno (19 episodes)
 A.J. Saudin as Connor DeLaurier (6 episodes)
 Olivia Scriven as Maya Matlin (24 episodes)
 Melinda Shankar as Alli Bhandari (16 episodes) 
 Jessica Tyler as Jenna Middleton (7 episodes)
 Sara Waisglass as Francesca "Frankie" Hollingsworth (25 episodes)
 Richard Walters as Deon "Tiny" Bell (15 episodes)1
 Niamh Wilson as Jack Jones (13 episodes)

Joining the main cast this season are: 
 Amanda Arcuri as Lola Pacini (20 episodes)
 Reiya Downs as Shaylynn "Shay" Powers (18 episodes)
 Ehren Kassam as Jonah Haak (7 episodes)2

The five actors who did not return this season or were demoted to recurring/guest star status are:

 Jahmil French as Dave Turner
 Alicia Josipovic as Bianca DeSousa
 Cory Lee as Winnie Oh
 Chloe Rose as Katie Matlin
 Jordan Todosey as Adam Torres

Shane Kippel, who portrayed Gavin "Spinner" Mason in the first nine seasons, returned for a cameo role.

: Spencer MacPherson and Richard Walters were promoted to the main cast after recurring in the previous season.

: Although Ehren Kassam was not credited with the main cast in the credits, Bell Media and Epitome still considered him a series regular.

Crew
Season fourteen is produced by Epitome Pictures in association with Bell Media and DHX Media. Funding was provided by The Canadian Media Fund, The Shaw Rocket Fund, RBC Royal Bank, The Canadian Film or Video Production Tax Credit, and the Ontario Film and Television Tax Credit.

Linda Schuyler, co-creator of the Degrassi franchise and CEO of Epitome Pictures, serves as an executive producer with her husband, and President of Epitome Pictures, Stephen Stohn. Matt Huether is also credited as a co-executive producer, Karen Hill as consulting producer, Sarah Glinsli an executive producer, and Ella Schwarzman an executive post producer. Stefan Brogren is series producer, while David Lowe is credited as producer, and Stephanie Williams the supervising producer. The casting directors are Larissa Mair and Krisha Bullock Alexander, and the editors include Jason B. Irvine and Gordon Thorne.

The executive story editor is Matt Schiller, the story editors are Ian Malone and Sadiya Durrani, and Courtney Jane Walker is the senior story editor. Episode writers for the season include Ramona Barckert, Courtney Jane Walker, Karen Hill, Michael Grassi, Scott Oleszkowicz, Mike Mcphaden, Matt Huether, and Matt Schiller. The director of photography is Mitchell T. Ness, and the directors include Stefan Brogren, Rt!, and Bruce McDonald.

Episodes

References

External links
 
 

Degrassi: The Next Generation seasons
2014 Canadian television seasons
2015 Canadian television seasons